The High Commission of Malaysia in London is the diplomatic mission of Malaysia in the United Kingdom. Prior to independence the then-Malaya had a Commission in London; this was upgraded to a full High Commission upon independence in 1957. It was initially located on Trafalgar Square before relocating to Great Portland Street; it then moved to its current location in the mid 1960s.

References

External links
Official site

Malaysia
Diplomatic missions of Malaysia
Malaysia–United Kingdom relations
Buildings and structures in the City of Westminster
Belgravia
Malaysia and the Commonwealth of Nations
United Kingdom and the Commonwealth of Nations